Mats Olof Foyer (born 3 November 1954) is the former ambassador of the Kingdom of Sweden accredited to and resident in the People's Democratic Republic of Korea (North Korea), a position he held from 2005-2010.

Education
Foyer has an LL.B. and BA from the University of Stockholm and speaks Swedish, English, Russian and French.

Diplomatic career
From 2002-2005 Foyer was minister in charge of political affairs at the Swedish Embassy in Beijing. Foyer has served in other posts including:

 Russian Federation 
 Czech Republic

At home in Sweden he worked at the Russian desk at Sweden’s Ministry of Foreign Affairs.

Foyer was involved in the talks to release American journalists held in North Korea. He met with the journalists several times while they were held.  The government of Sweden represents the United States in North Korea in lieu of an American embassy.

References

Living people
1954 births
Ambassadors of Sweden to North Korea
Stockholm University alumni
20th-century Swedish lawyers